Aethalida borneana is a moth of the family Erebidae. It was described by Jeremy Daniel Holloway in 1988. It is found on Borneo.

References

Moths described in 1988
Spilosomina
Moths of Asia